Krzykosy  is a village in Środa County, Greater Poland Voivodeship, in west-central Poland. It is the seat of the gmina (administrative district) called Gmina Krzykosy.

References

Villages in Środa Wielkopolska County